Canklow is a suburb of Rotherham, South Yorkshire, England. It forms part of the Boston Castle ward for the Metropolitan Borough of Rotherham.

History
Canklow was created as a post Second World War council housing area. At the southern end of the estate there was once a coal mine, Rotherham Main Colliery. The mine opened in 1890 and closed in 1954.

In 1981 the census revealed a male unemployment rate for Canklow of 42.1%, just under four times the national average.

From 1983 to 1986 Canklow was one of four areas in South Yorkshire where the Probation Service ran a victim/offender mediation project (one of the first of its kind in the country). The area at the time suffered high unemployment, a heroin problem and a suicide rate well above the high average

Landmarks
Education in the local area is provided by Canklow Woods Primary School and Oakwood High School.

There used to be a church in Canklow, but has now been converted to a sofa shop.

External links
Rotherham Metropolitan Borough Council

References

Geography of Rotherham